Roberto Masciarelli (born 5 September 1963) is an Italian volleyball player. He competed in the men's tournament at the 1992 Summer Olympics.

References

1963 births
Living people
Italian men's volleyball players
Olympic volleyball players of Italy
Volleyball players at the 1992 Summer Olympics
Sportspeople from Ancona